Tatiana Aleshina (born 3 July 1961, Nizhyn) is a Russian composer, singer-songwriter, theater artist, and poet. She is a music director of the St. Petersburg Demmeni Marionette Theatre, the oldest professional puppet theatre in Russia. She is a member of Union of Theatre Workers of the Russian Federation.

Biography
She was born in the city of Nizhyn. Three months later, her family moved to the closed city of Chelyabinsk-40, and then to the Tula region. She graduated from the School of Music in Kurgan. In 1987 she graduated from the Urals Mussorgsky State Conservatoire. Since 1996 Aleshina works as a music director in the Demmeni Marionette Theatre in St. Petersburg. Since 1992 she collaborates with theater of Elena Kamburova.

Awards
 Honored worker of culture of the Russian Federation

Selected discography
Her CDs, additional links
As we were flying on the ball, songs by Tatiana Aleshina, performed by Elena Kamburova, Elena Frolova, Alena Chie and others
 2000: I'm not asking for love
 2002: Seconda Parte, disk in collaboration with creative group AZIA 
 2005: Mandelshtam Street, songs on poetry by Osip Mandelshtam
 2007: Where are you, father's house...

References

Links
Her website in ASIA 
Her website on bards.ru
Facebook page
VK page
Records on her Soundcloud site

Russian women singer-songwriters
Russian musicians
Russian women poets
Living people
1961 births
People from Nizhyn
Russian singer-songwriters
Russian women musicians
Soviet women singer-songwriters
Soviet singer-songwriters
20th-century Russian musicians
20th-century Russian women musicians
21st-century Russian musicians
20th-century Russian women singers
20th-century Russian singers
21st-century women musicians